HMAS Siesta was a channel patrol boat operated by the  Naval Auxiliary Patrol of the Royal Australian Navy  during World War II. Siesta was destroyed in an explosion and burnt to the waterline at Fremantle, Australia, on 23 September 1942. Four crew were injured in the explosion.

Notes

References

Patrol vessels of the Royal Australian Navy
Maritime incidents in September 1942